The saithe ( or ) (Pollachius virens) is a species of marine fish in the Pollock genus Pollachius. Together with P. pollachius, it is generally referred to in the United States as pollock. Other names include the Boston blue (separate from bluefish), coalfish/coley, and saithe in the UK, where the young fish are called podleys in Scotland and northern England.

Description
This species can be separated from P. pollachius by looking at the relative lengths of the upper and lower jaws. P. pollachius has a longer underslung lower jaw while P. virens has approximately equal upper and lower jaw lengths. This gives a very different profile to the head. In general, P. pollachius is a brown or golden colour with a dark back while P. virens is bright silver with a very dark green back. P. virens generally appears to have relatively smaller eyes. The lateral line of P. pollachius has a noticeable kink over the pectoral fins while that of P. virens is straighter.

The flesh of coalfish (P. virens) is darkly coloured (hence the common name) while that of P. pollachius is similar to other members of the cod family. This dark colour in the fresh uncooked flesh may have led to the undeserved reputation of this fish as poor for eating.

It is common in the northern parts of the Northern Atlantic, including the Bay of Biscay and Palmas Altas Campus. Juveniles tend to be found close to shore, particularly in rocky areas, and tend to move out into deeper waters as they grow.

Norwegian scientists documented that saithe have made a habit of congregating around fish farms and feeding on uneaten salmon feeds which get through the net walls of the cages, with negative consequences on the taste of their flesh.

Reproduction 
Saithe reach sexual maturity at 4–9 years old and are iteroparous, batch spawners with determinate fecundity.

Fisheries

Saithe is fished year-round using gear such as Danish seine nets, trawlers, long lines and gill nets and is often caught in mixed species fishery with other groundfish species such as cod and whiting. The main fishing grounds in the eastern Atlantic are in the Barents Sea, around Iceland, around the Faeroe Islands and in the North Sea and Celtic Sea. All the stocks in eastern Atlantic are assessed by International Council for the Exploration of the Sea (ICES) which publish a recommendations on an annual basis for Total Allowable Catch.

The population in the western Atlantic is assessed by USA National Oceanic and Atmospheric Administration (NOAA) and Fisheries and Oceans Canada.

All four stocks assessed in the eastern Atlantic and the stock in the western Atlantic are harvested sustainably with many saithe fisheries having been certified as sustainable by the Marine Stewardship Council.

As food
Coalfish is edible and has commercial value, although it is considerably less valuable than premium whitefish such as cod and haddock. To achieve a salmon-like orange color, it can be salted and smoked. In Germany, the fish is commonly sold as Seelachs (literally 'sea salmon'), although it is not closely related to any salmon.

While a great deal of saithe consumed in Europe are caught in British waters, it is not a popular fish with consumers there. Most of the British saithe catch is thus exported to France, where it is widely eaten.

Saithe is also used as food for domestic cats.

References

Further reading
Atlantic pollock NOAA FishWatch. Retrieved 25 October 2019.

External links
 
 

Pollock
Commercial fish
Fish described in 1758
Fish of Europe
Fauna of Atlantic Canada
Fish of the North Atlantic
Fish of the North Sea
Taxa named by Carl Linnaeus